Katie Lohmann (born January 29, 1980) is a model and actress. She was the Playboy Playmate for the Month in April 2001.

Her first appearance in Playboy was in the Playmate 2000 search pictorial, published in the December 1999 issue. In that pictorial, she was described as a 19-year-old massage therapist.  She is a Scientologist.

In November 2006, Lohmann was part of a trio of Playmates (along with Tina Marie Jordan and Karen McDougal) who appeared in the "Celebrity Playmate Gift Guide" pictorial of Splat magazine, a paintball enthusiasts magazine. The pictorial showcased new paintball products for the 2006 holiday season.

Lohmann appeared as "Hardbody" of the month in Iron Man magazine several times, including a pictorial together with frequent collaborator Karen McDougal in the November 2009 issue.

Filmography
 2012 – The Deceit
 2010 – Dahmer vs. Gacy
 2007 – Strike
 2006 – Room 6
 2003 – Dorm Daze
 2003 – The Mummy's Kiss
 2002 – The Hot Chick
 2001 – Tomcats

References

External links

 

1980 births
Living people
21st-century American actresses
American Scientologists
Actresses from Scottsdale, Arizona
2000s Playboy Playmates
Legends Football League players